Maksym Olehovych Ahapov (born 28 February 2000) is a Ukrainian professional footballer who plays as a right-back for Ukrainian club Kramatorsk.

References

External links
 
 

2000 births
Living people
Place of birth missing (living people)
Kharkiv State College of Physical Culture 1 alumni
Ukrainian footballers
Association football defenders
FC Zorya Luhansk players
FC VPK-Ahro Shevchenkivka players
FC Kramatorsk players
Ukrainian First League players